Dope is an American documentary web television series airing since  on Netflix. The show revolves around the production, logistics, sale and consumption of drugs. Camera teams follow law enforcement as well as users and dealers of various drugs.

Production
During the shooting of an interview with three drug dealers in Beek, Netherlands for the third season of the show, local police invaded their home and arrested the men whilst the camera was rolling. According to local newspaper De Limburger, police had been monitoring one of the dealers and thus found out about the scheduled interview. The two filmmakers present were interrogated but released shortly after. According to police, firearms found on the table were fake, as was a large portion of the alleged drugs.

In January 2019, a 21-year-old man from Troy, Michigan was arrested for drug trafficking through Oakland County and surrounding communities. The Oakland County Sheriff's Office began investing the man, who operated under the pseudonym "Ozone", in July 2018 after receiving a tip. The tip also mentioned the man's engagement in the third episode of the second season of Dope. After executing search warrants on two locations, police found various amounts of different drugs and took the man into custody. He was booked on multiple drug trafficking charges, to all of which he pleaded guilty and was sentenced to 3–20 years in federal prison in June 2019.

Episodes

Season 1 (2017)

Season 2 (2018)

Season 3 (2019)

References

External links
 
 

Netflix original documentary television series
2010s American documentary television series
2017 American television series debuts
English-language Netflix original programming
Television series about organized crime
Works about Mexican drug cartels
Works about Colombian drug cartels
Television series by Warner Bros. Television Studios